Ambigolimax valentianus (also known as Lehmannia valentiana) is a species of terrestrial slug, a pulmonate gastropod mollusc in the family Limacidae. It has spread very widely around the world, especially in greenhouses, where it can be a pest; in warmer climates it has often then spread outdoors. Comparatively much has been learnt about its life cycle and temperature relations. Dissection is necessary to reliably distinguish it from congeners in regions where these co-occur.

Description 

External appearance does not reliably distinguish Ambigolimax valentianus from other members of the genus, such as A. parvipenis, with which it may co-occur. Like other members of the Limacidae, it has a pointed tail and the pneumostome lies in the posterior half of the mantle. Often the most obvious character of an Ambigolimax slug is the two parallel, sharply defined, dark lines along the mantle, sometimes with a thicker less well defined line lying between. Two similar lines may lie more posteriorly along the back either side of the midline, but all these lines may be faint or even absent in some individuals. Others have further dots and mottled patches of darker pigment. The dorsal coloration is most often pinkish brown, but sometimes dull yellowish or grey, and all shades inbetween. Older individuals tend to be yellower with less prominent lines but more prominent mottling. The mucus is colourless, transparent, and watery. Maximum length is about 8 cm.Ambigolimax valentianus is identifiable from the internal genitalia, which require dissection to examine. In particular it has a substantial sausage-shaped penial appendage at the inner end of the penis; rarely the appendage is swollen towards its tip. Sometimes the appendage appears absent because it is inverted into the lumen of the penis. This might cause confusion with A. parvipenis but the penis of A. valentianus without the appendage is about as long as the bursa copulatrix and its duct, whereas it is only about half the length in A. parvipenis.

Life cycle and ecology
In captivity, at about 17 °C, eggs took roughly 3 weeks to hatch, and hatchlings took about 24 weeks to first lay eggs. These slugs laid of the order of 150 eggs in their lifetimes, but one individual laid 1510 eggs. Eggs were laid in clutches, ranging widely in size but 40 eggs was typical. About half of slugs kept singly had died within 15 months, but some lived for over two years. At 5 °C eggs took much longer to hatch (17 weeks); above 25 °C all eggs died, although a small proportion survived briefer (1 hour) exposures to 31 °C. Hatchlings mostly survived 34 °C, but not 36 °C. However, resistance to heat varies adaptively through the year, as does resistance to cold; in the middle of winter half the individuals could survive −8 °C, whereas for hatchlings in March the equivalent figure was −3 °C.

In subtropical parts of Japan, A. valentianus has an annual life cycle and reproduces during the colder part of the year; egg laying occurs between November and May but is depressed in the coldest months. Sperm is first produced a little earlier during development than eggs. Most eggs hatch in April. In spring two generations of the slug coexist, overlapping in size, before the older generation dies off by June. In more temperate parts of Japan, the life cycle is similar, but shifted two months earlier, so that slugs mature already by August or September and die by May. In both populations the trigger for maturation is day length.

Slugs kept singly without the opportunity to mate nevertheless produced as many fertile eggs as those kept in groups. However, population genetic data implies that free-living individuals largely cross with others.Ambigolimax valentianus eats green leaves and shoots, and consequently can be a pest in greenhouses or even outdoors. It also eats animal matter and fallen leaves. Activity and feeding start before sunset, peaking in the earlier part of the night. This species seldom climbs up trees and during the day is most commonly found under boards, rocks and plant containers. Often its first discovery in a country has been in greenhouses, from whence it has spread to gardens, other synanthropic habitats outdoors, and even to woodland, likely facilitated nowadays by global warming. Where it has been introduced, this species may become the dominant slug. A bizarre consequence of its abundance on Gough Island is that it prevented the eradication of another introduction, the house mouse, by consuming the poison bait dropped from helicopters.

Distribution
This species has been recorded widely around the world, its spread starting already over 100 years ago. In the following list, oceanic islands are considered separately from the mainland countries to which they belong. If the date of first collection is not given in the cited source, the publication date of the first report is listed instead. 

Europe
 Spain: since 1821
 Portugal: since 1891
 Andorra: since 2000
 France: since 1954
 Great Britain: since 1936 (greenhouses), 1985–1986 (outdoors)
 Island of Ireland: since 1932 (botanic garden), 1981 (outdoors)
 Belgium: since 1946 (greenhouse), 1973 (outdoors)
 The Netherlands: since 1962
 Germany: since 1948 (greenhouse)
 Denmark: since 1959
 Sweden: since 1921 (greenhouses)
 Norway: since 1967 (greenhouses)
 Finland: since 1960s (greenhouses)
 Latvia: since 2009 (botanical garden)
 Lithuania: since 2010 (indoor garden)
 Poland: since 1963
 Switzerland: isolated report from 1918
 Italy: since 1979 (outdoors)
 Malta: since 1986
 Czech Republic: since 1960 (greenhouses)
 Slovakia: since 2020 (outdoors)
 Austria: since 1980 (botanical garden)
 Serbia: since 2010 (indoor garden)
 Greece: since 2007
 Romania: since 1962 (greenhouses)
 European Russia: since 1980

Africa
 Algeria: since 19th century
 Morocco: since 1985
 Libya: since 2018–2019
 Egypt: since 2014–2018
 South Africa: since 1961

Asia
 Turkey: since 2017
 Israel: since 1979, by 2015 the commonest garden slug
 Uzbekistan: since 1980
 Kazakhstan: since 1996
 Iran: since 2004:
 Japan: since late 1950s
 China: since 1978
 Singapore: since 2020 (in cooled glasshouses)

Australasia
 Australia: since 1911
 New Zealand: since 1979

Americas
 USA: since 1917 (greenhouses); already by 1961 known from California, Colorado, Missouri, Arizona, Oklahoma, New York State, Michigan, Ohio, New Jersey, Massachusetts, Pennsylvania, Kansas, Maryland
 Canada: since 1972 (greenhouses, Manitoba), 2000 (outdoors, British Columbia)
 Dominican Republic: since 2012
 Mexico: since 2017
 Colombia: since 1963
 Venezuela: since 1982
 Brazil: since 1976
 Argentina: since 1924
 Chile: since 1893

Oceanic Islands
 Canary Islands (Spain): since 1950
 Azores (Portugal): since 1957
 Madeira (Portugal): since 1978
 Tristan da Cunha (UK): since 1982
 Gough Island (UK): since 2000
 Hawaii (USA): since 1982
 Juan Fernandez Islands (Chile): since 1908
 Easter Island (Chile): since 1917
 Ulleung Island (South Korea): since 2018 (identification only as Ambigolimax sp.)

Further studiesAmbigolimax valentianus'' has been used as a model species for studying the neuromechanisms of learning and memory, particularly by researchers in Japan. Its mucus has been analysed chemically to understand why slug mucus is sticky. Various studies have examined the bacteria and helminth parasites associated with the species.

References

External links

  Species summary for Lehmannia valentiana at Animalbase: taxonomy, short description, distribution, biology, status (threats), images 
 Lehmannia valentiana  on the UF / IFAS Featured Creatures Web site

valentianus
Gastropods described in 1821

ja:チャコウラナメクジ
sv:Valentinsnigel
fi:Taimietana
war:Lehmannia valentiana